Monticello is the name of some places in the U.S. state of Wisconsin:

Monticello, Green County, Wisconsin
Monticello, Lafayette County, Wisconsin

nl:Monticello (Wisconsin)
pt:Monticello (Wisconsin)